This article presents a list of the historical events and publications of Australian literature during 1937.

Books 

 Martin Boyd – The Picnic
 Eleanor Dark – Sun Across the Sky
 M. Barnard Eldershaw – Plaque with Laurel
 Arthur Gask – Night of the Storm
 Ion Idriess – Forty Fathoms Deep
 Michael Innes – Hamlet, Revenge!
 Seaforth Mackenzie – The Young Desire It
 Leonard Mann – A Murder in Sydney
 Vance Palmer – Legend for Sanderson
 Katharine Susannah Prichard – Intimate Strangers
 Helen Simpson – Under Capricorn
 Arthur Upfield – Winds of Evil

Poetry 

 Rosemary Dobson – Poems
Nora Kelly – The song-maker and other verse
 Jack Lindsay – "On Guard for Spain"
 John Shaw Neilson – "I Spoke to the Violet"

Drama 

 Sumner Locke Elliott
 The Cow Jumped Over the Moon
 Glorious Noon
 Miles Franklin – No Family
 T. Inglis Moore – Best Australian One-Act Plays complied with William Moore
 Katharine Susannah Prichard – Women of Spain

Awards and honours

Literary

Births 

A list, ordered by date of birth (and, if the date is either unspecified or repeated, ordered alphabetically by surname) of births in 1937 of Australian literary figures, authors of written works or literature-related individuals follows, including year of death.

 19 February – Lee Harding, novelist
 1 June – Colleen McCullough, novelist (died 2015)

Deaths 

A list, ordered by date of death (and, if the date is either unspecified or repeated, ordered alphabetically by surname) of deaths in 1937 of Australian literary figures, authors of written works or literature-related individuals follows, including year of birth.

 15 March – Catherine Edith Macauley Martin, novelist (born 1848)
 27 March – Ethel Castilla, journalist, poet and short story writer (born 1861)

See also 
 1937 in poetry
 List of years in literature
 List of years in Australian literature
 1937 in literature
 1936 in Australian literature
 1937 in Australia
 1938 in Australian literature

References

Literature
Australian literature by year
20th-century Australian literature